This aims to be a complete list of Blu-ray manufacturers.
This list is not necessarily complete or up to date - if you see a manufacturer that should be here but is not (or one that should not be here but is), please update the page accordingly.



A
 American Recordable Media
 Ayankaran International
 Acu-disc

C
 Cambridge Audio
 CMC Magnetics

D
 Denon

F
 Fukuda

I
Imation
Insignia

J
 JVC

L
 LaCie
 LG

M
 Maxell
 Microsoft
 Moser Baer

O
 OPPO Digital

P
 Panasonic
 Philips
 Pioneer Corporation

R
 Ritek
 River Pro Audio

S
 Sony
 Samsung
 Sharp

V
 Verbatim Corporation

Y
 Yamaha Corporation

References

See also
 Blu-ray Disc authoring
 Blu-ray Disc
 Blu-ray Disc Association
 Blu-ray Disc recordable
 Blu-ray Region Code
 CBHD Based on HD DVD format.
 Comparison of high definition optical disc formats
 Digital rights management
 HD DVD
 HD NVD
 High definition optical disc format war
 Optical disc
 PlayStation 3
 PlayStation 4
 Xbox One

Audio storage
Blu-ray Disc
Computer storage media
Consumer electronics
DVD
High-definition television
Java platform
Lists of consumer electronics manufacturers